Shooting brake (sometimes referred to as a  "shooting break") is a car body style which originated in the 1890s as a horse-drawn wagon used to transport shooting parties with their equipment and game.

The first automotive shooting brakes were manufactured in the early 1900s in the United Kingdom. The vehicle style became popular there during the 1920s and 1930s. They were produced by vehicle manufacturers or as conversions by coachbuilders. The term was used in Britain interchangeably with estate car from the 1930s but has not been in general use for many years and has been more or less superseded by the latter term.

The term has evolved to describe cars combining elements of both station wagon (estate) and coupé body styles, with or without reference to the historical usage for shooting parties. A shooting brake is a subcategory of a station wagon, based on a coupé rather than a sedan. Being based on two-door coupés is why manufacturers call models such as the Mercedes-Benz CLA, and Mercedes-Benz CLS shooting brakes.

Horse-drawn wagons

Like many early automotive body styles, the shooting brake was originally a type of horse-drawn vehicle. A brake was originally a heavy drag chassis with slowing capability hooked to spirited horses, while a “break” was a large carriage-frame (having two or four wheels) with no body, used for breaking in young horses.  The term brake later became broader in definition, being used for wagons in general.

The shooting brake, which began in England in the 1890s, was a wagon (more specifically a type of wagonette) designed to transport hunting spoils, gun racks, and ammunition on shooting trips.

Definition
There is no universally agreed definition of a shooting brake as an autobody style; however the common themes are the coupé and station wagon, and the historical usage of the vehicle for hunting trips. Descriptions of the body style and usage of the term include:
 "A sleek wagon with two doors and sports-car panache, its image entangled with European aristocracy, fox hunts and baying hounds".
 "A cross between an estate and a coupé".
 "Essentially a two-door station wagon".
 An interchangeable term for estate car (station wagon). In France, a station wagon is marketed as a break, once having been called a break de chasse, which translates as "hunting break".
 A body style with "a very interesting profile. It makes use of the road space it covers a little better than a normal coupé, and also helps the rear person with headroom... The occasional use of the rear seat means you can do one of these cars, even if such a wagon lacks the everyday practicality of four doors."
 A vehicle conceived "to take gentlemen on the hunt with their firearms and dogs... and "although [its] glory days came before World War II, and it has faded from the scene in recent decades, the body style is showing signs of a renaissance" (as of 2006). "The most famous shooting brakes had custom two-door bodies fitted to the chassis of pedigreed cars".

1900s to 1950s

In the early 1900s, the Scottish Albion Motors began producing shooting brake models, described in the weekly magazine The Commercial Motor as having "seats for eight persons as well as the driver, whilst four guns and a large supply of cartridges, provisions baskets and a good 'bag' can be carried."

The 1912 Hudson Model 33 was described in England as a shooting brake, on the basis that "...it was also used to carry the beaters to and from the location of the shoot, and for bringing back the game shot".

Early motorized safari vehicles were described as shooting brakes with no windows or doors. "Instead roll-down canvas curtains were buttoned to the roof in the case of bad weather. These cars were heavy and comfortable in good weather and allowed quick and silent exit as no shooting was permitted from the vehicles."

During the 1920s and 1930s, shooting brake vehicles were popular in England, and were produced as shooting brakes from the factory or converted by coachbuilders. The term "estate car" began to be used instead of shooting brake, as the use of the vehicle expanded from just shooting parties to other domestic uses including ferrying guests and their luggage to and from railway stations.

1960s to 1990s
During the 1960s and early 1970s, several high end European manufacturers produced two-door shooting brake versions of their sports cars, including the 1960 Sunbeam Alpine Shooting Brake and 1965 Aston Martin DB5 Shooting Brake. The 1966 Sunbeam Alpine was a limited-production three-door variant of its two-door open sports car with leather interior and walnut trim, selling at a price double its open counterpart and marketed as a shooting brake. The Aston Martin DB5, DB6 and DBS shooting brakes were custom manufactured by coachbuilder Harold Radford from 1965 to 1967.

A prototype DB5 shooting-brake was custom produced by the factory for David Brown, an avid hunter and dog owner, and a further 11-12 coupés were custom modified for Aston Martin by independent coachbuilder, Harold Radford. In August 2019 a DB5 sold for a record $1.765m (£1.456m) making it the most valuable Shooting Brake bodied-car of any marque sold at auction.

In 1992, Aston Martin manufactured in-house a limited production shooting brake variant of its Virage/Vantage, including a four-door shooting brake.

Other cars combining elements of a wagon and coupé have been described but were never formally marketed as shooting brakes, including the Reliant Scimitar GTE (1968–1975), the Volvo P1800 ES (1972–1973) and the 1998 BMW Z3 Coupé (plus associated M Coupé model).

2000s to present
Mostly dormant since the mid-1970s, the shooting brake term appeared in 2004 with the Chevrolet Nomad concept car. The following year, the Audi Shooting Brake concept car was revealed at the Tokyo Motor Show.

Several other cars have been described by journalists as shooting brakes, including 2005 Dodge Magnum Station Wagon, 2006 Renault Altica concept car, 2008 Mini Clubman, 2011 Fisker Surf concept car and 2011 Ferrari FF.

The first production model of the 21st century marketed as a shooting brake was the 2012 Mercedes Benz CLS-Class Shooting Brake (X218), which was previewed as the Shooting Brake concept car at Auto China. This model has four (passenger) doors, which is at odds with some definitions of a shooting brake as being a two-door car but makes sense if one accepts the idea of a four-door coupé. In 2015, Mercedes-Benz added the smaller CLA-Class four-door shooting brake to the model range. Similarly, the 2018 Porsche Panamera Sport Turismo and Volkswagen Arteon are described by their manufacturers as a shooting brake (despite the Arteon having 5 doors).

The automotive press seems to "like shooting brakes" that seems to express a "yearning" for the design. The trend is to associate the shooting brake body style with "performance" and also making the cars "more practical" than a coupé. The marketing descriptions have been further blurred between variations of the terms with names such as sports tourer, sportback, or "shooting break" as a way to differentiate from SUVs and reposition ordinary body styles with "sleeker lines" in the minds of consumers to "ooze sex appeal."

See also 

 Coupé
 Hatchback
 Station wagon

References

External links
 Coachbuild.com Shooting Brakes Archive

 
 
Car classifications
Car body styles